, better known for both with her full name or by her stage name RINA, is a Japanese musician, singer and songwriter. She is the drummer and vocalist of the Japanese rock band Scandal. Suzuki is also part of a supergroup called Halloween Junky Orchestra led by established musicians such as Hyde and K.A.Z of Vamps for their October 2012 hit single Halloween Party.

Equipment
Suzuki plays and endorses Pearl Drums. She has her own signature edition snare drum and drumsticks made by the same company.

References

1991 births
Living people
Musicians from Nara Prefecture
Women drummers
Japanese rock drummers
Sony Music Entertainment Japan artists
Scandal (Japanese band) members
Japanese multi-instrumentalists
21st-century women musicians
21st-century drummers